The Shafi'i school (also spelled Shafei), or Madhhab al-Shāfiʿī, is one of the four major traditional schools of religious law (madhhab) in the Sunnī branch of Islam. It was founded by Arab theologian Muḥammad ibn Idrīs al-Shāfiʿī, "the father of Muslim jurisprudence", in the early 9th century.

The other three schools of Sunnī jurisprudence are Ḥanafī, Mālikī and Ḥanbalī. Like the other schools of fiqh, Shafii  recognize the First Four Caliphs as the Islamic prophet Muhammad's rightful successors and relies on the Qurʾān and the "sound" books of Ḥadīths as primary sources of law. The Shafi'i school affirms the authority of both divine law-giving (the Qurʾān and the Sunnah) and human speculation regarding the Law. Where passages of Qurʾān and/or the Ḥadīths are ambiguous, the school seeks guidance of Qiyās (analogical reasoning). The Ijmā' (consensus of scholars or of the community) was "accepted but not stressed". The school rejected the dependence on local traditions as the source of legal precedent and rebuffed the Ahl al-Ra'y (personal opinion) and the Istiḥsān (juristic discretion).

The Shafii school was widely followed in the Middle East until the rise of the Ottomans and the Safavids. Traders and merchants helped to spread Shafii Islam across the Indian Ocean, as far India and the Southeast Asia. The Shafii school is now predominantly found in parts of the Hejaz and the Levant, Lower Egypt and Yemen, and among the Kurdish people, in the Caucasus and across the Indian Ocean (Horn of Africa and the Swahili Coast in Africa and coastal South Asia and Southeast Asia).

Principles 

The fundamental principle of the Shafii thought depends on the idea that "to every act performed by a believer who is subject to the Law there corresponds a statute belonging to the Revealed Law or the Shari'a". This statute is either presented as such in the Qurʾān or the Sunnah or it is possible, by means of analogical reasoning (Qiyas), to infer it from the Qurʾān or the Sunnah.

Al-Shafii was the first jurist to insist that Ḥadīth were the decisive source of law (over traditional doctrines of earlier thoughts). In order of priority, the sources of jurisprudence according to the Shafii thought, are:

The Foundation (al asl) 
 Qurʾān — the sacred scripture of Islam. 
 Sunnah — defined by Al-Shāfiʿī  as "the sayings, the acts, and the tacit acquiescence of Prophet Muhammed as related in solidly established traditions".
The school rejected dependence on local community practice as the source of legal precedent.

Ma'qul al-asl 
 Qiyas with Legal Proof or Dalil Shari'a — "Analogical reasoning as applied to the deduction of juridical principles from the Qurʾān and the Sunnah."
 Analogy by Cause (Qiyas al-Ma'na/Qiyas al-Illa)
 Analogy by Resemblance (Qiyas al-Shabah)
 Ijmā' — consensus of scholars or of the community ("accepted but not stressed"). 
The concept of Istishab was first introduced by the later Shafii scholars. Al-Shafii  also postulated that "penal sanctions lapse in cases where repentance precedes punishment".

Risālah 
The groundwork legal text for the Shafii law is the Risālah ("the Message"), composed by Al-Shafii in Egypt. It outlines the principles of Shafii legal thought as well as the derived jurisprudence. A first version of the Risālah, "al-Risalah al-Qadima", produced by Al-Shafii  during his stay in Baghdad, is currently lost.

Differences from Mālikī and Ḥanafī thoughts 
Al-Shāfiʿī fundamentally criticised the concept of judicial conformism (the Istiḥsan).

With Mālikī view 
 Shafii school argued that various existing local traditions may not reflect the practice of Prophet Muhammed (a critique to the Mālikī thought). The local traditions, according to the Shāfiʿī understanding, thus cannot be treated as sources of law.

With Ḥanafī view 
 The Shafii school rebuffed the Ahl al-Ra'y (personal opinion) and the Istiḥsān (juristic discretion). It insisted that the rules of the jurists could no longer be invoked in legal issues without additional authentications. The school refused to admit doctrines that had no textual basis in either the Qurʾān or Ḥadīths, but were based on the opinions of Islamic scholars (the Imams). 
 The Shafii thinking believes that the methods may help to "substitute man for God and Prophet Muhammed, the only legitimate legislators" and "true knowledge and correct interpretation of religious obligations would suffer from arbitrary judgments infused with error".

History 

Al-Shāfiʿī (c. 767–820 AD) visited most of the great centres of Islamic jurisprudence in the Middle East during the course of his travels and amassed a comprehensive knowledge of the different ways of legal theory. He was a student of scholars Mālik ibn Anas, the founder of the Mālikī school of law, and Muḥammad Shaybānī, the great Ḥanafī intellectual in Baghdad.

 The Shafii thoughts were initially spread by Al-Shafii students in Cairo and Baghdad. By the 10th century, the holy cities of Mecca and Medina and Syria also became chief centres of Shafii ideas. 
 The school later exclusively held the judgeships in Syria, Kirman, Bukhara and the Khorasan. It also flourished in Northern Mesopotamia and in Daylam. The Ghurids also endorsed the Shafiis in the 11th and 12th centuries AD. 
 Under Salah al-Din, the Shafii school again became the paramount thought in Egypt (the region had come under Shi'a influence prior to this period). It was the "official school" of the Ayyubid dynasty and remained prominent during Mamlūk period also. Baybars, the Mamlūk sultan, later appointed judges from all four madhabs in Egypt.
 Traders and merchants helped to spread Shafii Islam across the Indian Ocean, as far India and the Southeast Asia.

Under Ottomans and the Safavids 

 Rise of the Ottomans in the 16th century resulted in the replacement of Shafii  judges by Ḥanafī scholars.
 Under the Safavids, Shafii preeminence in Central Asia was replaced by Shi'a Islam.

Distribution 
The Shafii school is presently predominant in the following parts of the world:
 Middle East and North Africa: Parts of Hejaz, the Levant (Palestine, Jordan and a  significant number in Syria, Lebanon, and Iraq), Lower Egypt, among Sunnis in Iran and  Yemen, and the Kurdish people. 
 Asia: Northern region of Azerbaijan, Dagestan, Chechen and Ingush regions of the Caucasus.
 On the Indian Ocean
 Africa: Djibouti, Somalia, Ethiopia, Eritrea and the Swahili Coast (Kenya and Tanzania).
 South Asia: Maldives, Sri Lanka and southern India (Kerala, southern Tamil Nadu, western Karnataka).
 Southeast Asia: Indonesia, Malaysia, Singapore, Myanmar, Thailand, Brunei, and the southern Philippines.

The Shafii school is one of the largest school of Sunni madhhabs by number of adherents. The demographic data by each fiqh, for each nation, is unavailable and the relative demographic size are estimates.

Notable Shafiis 

 Al-Muzani
 Al-Ghazali
 Yahya ibn Sharaf al-Nawawi
 Fakhr al-Din al-Razi
 Ibn al-Nafis
 Ibn Kathir
 Izz al-Din ibn 'Abd al-Salam
 Ibn Daqiq al-'Id
 Al-Suyuti

In Hadith:
 Abu Zur'a al-Razi
 Abu Hatim al-Razi
 Ibn Khuzaymah
 Ibn Hibban
 Al-Khattabi
 Al-Daraqutni
 Hakim al-Nishaburi
 Abu Nu'aym al-Isfahani
 Al-Bayhaqi
 Al-Khatib al-Baghdadi
 Al-Baghawi
 Ibn Asakir
 Ibn al-Salah
 Ibn al-Najjar
 Al-Nawawi
 Al-Mizzi
 Al-Dhahabi
 Taqi al-Din al-Subki
 Ibn Kathir
 Ibn al-Mulaqqin
 Zain al-Din al-'Iraqi
 Ali ibn Abu Bakr al-Haythami
 Ibn Hajar al-Asqalani
 Al-Sakhawi
 Al-Suyuti
 Al-Qastallani
 Ibn Hajar al-Haytami

In Tafsir:

 Al-Tabari
 Ahmad ibn Muhammad al-Tha'labi
 Al-Baghawi
 Fakhr al-Din al-Razi
 Ibn Kathir
 Taqi al-Din al-Subki
 Al-Baydawi
 Al-Mahalli
 Al-Suyuti
 Said Nursî
 Hamka

In Fiqh:

 Al-Khattabi
 Al-Mawardi
 Abu Ishaq al-Shirazi
 Al-Juwayni
 Al-Ghazali
 Al-Baghawi
 Izz al-Din ibn 'Abd al-Salam
 Ibn al-Salah
 Al-Nawawi
 Taqi al-Din al-Subki
 Siraj al-Din al-Bulqini
 Ibn al-Mulaqqin
 Al-Baydawi
 Al-Mahalli
 Zakariyya al-Ansari
 Al-Suyuti
 Ibn Hajar al-Haytami
 Sayf al-Din al-Amidi
 Ahmad ibn Naqib al-Misri
 Zainuddin Makhdoom I
 Ibn Nuhaas
 Abdallah al-Qutbi

In Usul al-Fiqh:

 Abu Ishaq al-Shirazi
 Al-Juwayni
 Al-Ghazali
 Fakhr al-Din al-Razi
 Izz al-Din ibn 'Abd al-Salam
 Taqi al-Din al-Subki
 Al-Mahalli
 Al-Suyuti

In Arabic language studies:

 Ibn Malik
 Ibn Hisham
 Fairuzabadi
 Taqi al-Din al-Subki
 Al-Suyuti

In Theology:

 Ibn Kullab
 Abu al-Hasan al-Ash'ari
 Ibn Furak
 Abu Mansur al-Baghdadi
 Al-Bayhaqi
 Al-Juwayni
 Al-Ghazali
 Fakhr al-Din al-Razi
 Izz al-Din ibn 'Abd al-Salam
 Taqi al-Din al-Subki

In Philosophy:

 Abd al-Jabbar ibn Ahmad

In Sufism

 Harith al-Muhasibi
 Abd al-Karīm ibn Hawāzin Qushayri
 Abu Talib al-Makki
 Imam al-Haddad
 Ahmad Ghazali
 Ayn al-Quzat Hamadani
 Abu al-Najib Suhrawardi
 Shahab al-Din Suhrawardi
 Yusuf Hamdani
 Ahmed ar-Rifa'i
 Najm al-Din Kubra
 Shams Tabrizi
 Safi-ad-din Ardabili
 Kamal Khujandi
 Yusuf an-Nabhani
 Abd Al-Rahman bin Ahmad al-Zayla'i

In history

 Al-Khatib al-Baghdadi
 Ibn 'Asakir
 Ali ibn al-Athir
 Ibn al-Najjar
 Ibn Khallikan
 Al-Dhahabi
 Taqi al-Din al-Nabhani

Statesmen

 Saladin
 Nizam al-Mulk

Contemporary Shafii scholars 

From Middle East and North Africa:

 Ahmed Kuftaro
 Ali Gomaa
 Habib Umar bin Hafiz
 Abdullah al-Harari
 Ali al-Jifri
 Mohammad Salim Al-Awa
 Wahba Zuhayli
 Taha Jabir Alalwani
 Taha Karaan

From Southeast Asia:

 Afifi al-Akiti
 Ahmad Syafi'i Maarif
 Hasyim Muzadi
 Syed Muhammad Naquib al-Attas

From South Asia:

 Muhammad Jifri Muthukkoya Thangal
 Sayyid Abdu Rahman Ullal Thangal
 K. Ali Kutty Musliyar
 Kanniyath Ahmed Musliyar
 E. K. Aboobacker Musliyar
 Zainuddin Makhdoom II
 Kanthapuram A.P Aboobacker Musliyar
 Cherussery Zainuddeen Musliyar

See also 

 Sunni Islam
 Hanafi
 Maliki
 Hanbali
 Shia Islam

References

Notes 

 1."The law provides sanctions for any religious practice other than the Sunni Shafiʽi doctrine of Islam and for prosecution of converts from Islam, and bans proselytizing for any religion except Islam."

Citations

Bibliography 

Primary sources

 
 
 

Scholarly sources

Further reading 

 
 
 Yahia, Mohyddin (2009). Shafii et les deux sources de la loi islamique, Turnhout: Brepols Publishers, 
 Rippin, Andrew (2005). Muslims: Their Religious Beliefs and Practices (3rd ed.). London: Routledge. pp. 90–93. .
 Calder, Norman, Jawid Mojaddedi, and Andrew Rippin (2003). Classical Islam: A Sourcebook of Religious Literature. London: Routledge. Section 7.1.
 Schacht, Joseph (1950). The Origins of Muhammadan Jurisprudence. Oxford: Oxford University. pp. 16.
 Khadduri, Majid (1987). Islamic Jurisprudence: Shafii's Risala. Cambridge: Islamic Texts Society. pp. 286.
 Abd Majid, Mahmood (2007). Tajdid Fiqh Al-Imam Al-Syafi'i. Seminar pemikiran Tajdid Imam As Shafie 2007.
 al-Shafii, Muhammad b. Idris, "The Book of the Amalgamation of Knowledge" translated by A.Y. Musa in Hadith as Scripture: Discussions on The Authority Of Prophetic Traditions in Islam, New York: Palgrave, 2008

External links 

 Shafi'iyyah (University of Cumbria)

 
Madhhab
Sunni Islamic branches
Schools of Sunni jurisprudence
Sunni Islam